Vittangi is a locality situated in Kiruna Municipality, Norrbotten County, Sweden with 784 inhabitants in 2010.

The village of Vittangi was founded in 1674 by Henrik Mickelsson Kyrö from Pello.

The locality is very notable because it houses a cluster of people exhibiting congenital insensitivity to pain.

In February 1985, Vittangi recorded the coldest month ever in Scandinavia, with a mean of −27.2 °C.

Climate
<div style="width:80%;">

References 

Populated places in Kiruna Municipality
Lapland (Sweden)
Populated places in Arctic Sweden
Populated places established in 1674